The Samsung Galaxy J3 Pro is an Android smartphone manufactured by Samsung Electronics. The phone is made for the Chinese market and branded by China Telecom.

Specifications

Hardware 
The Galaxy J3 Pro is powered by a Snapdragon 410 SoC including a quad-core 1.2 GHz ARM Cortex-A53 CPU, an Adreno 306 GPU with 2 GB RAM. The 16 GB of internal storage can be upgraded up to 256 GB via microSD card.

It features a 5.0-inch Super AMOLED display with a HD Ready resolution. The 8 MP rear camera has f/2.2 aperture. The front camera has 5 MP, also with f/2.2 aperture.

Software 
The J3 Pro shipped with Android 5.1.1 "Lollipop" and Samsung's TouchWiz user interface.

See also 
 Samsung Galaxy
 Samsung Galaxy J series

References

External links 
 (Chinese)

Samsung Galaxy
Samsung smartphones
Android (operating system) devices
Mobile phones introduced in 2016
Discontinued smartphones
Mobile phones with user-replaceable battery